This article contains lists of official candidates associated with the 2008 Republican Party presidential primaries for the 2008 United States presidential election.

In accordance with the 22nd Amendment, incumbent President George W. Bush was prohibited from running for president in 2008, having served two full terms in the office. Vice President Dick Cheney chose not to run for president.

On March 4, 2008, John McCain became the Republican presumptive presidential nominee when he obtained the 1,191 delegates necessary to receive the party's nomination. Mike Huckabee announced his withdrawal from the race later in the evening. McCain's last remaining competitor in the race, Ron Paul, withdrew on June 12, 2008.

Delegate race count
This chart shows the total number of delegates committed to each candidate from the Primaries/caucuses/state conventions (different state parties use varied methods for electing delegates).

Nominee

Withdrew during the primary elections

Withdrew before primary elections

See also
 2008 Republican National Convention
 2008 Republican Party vice presidential selection
 2008 Republican Party presidential primaries
 2008 Nationwide opinion polling for the United States presidential election
 2008 Democratic Party presidential candidates
 2008 United States third party and independent presidential candidates
 2008 United States presidential election timeline

References

External links
Select2008 - Compare and choose candidates based on their political platform
Politics1 Presidency 2008
MyMapps mashup showing Eventful demand for the candidates.
Spartan Internet Political Performance (SIPP) Index - Ranking of Republican Candidates Internet popularity

 
Republican Party (United States) politicians
2008 United States Republican presidential primaries